These are the rosters of the two teams who competed for the 2009 FIBA Oceania Championship.

Head coach:  Brett Brown

Head coach:  Nenad Vucinic

References 
 FIBA Oceania Championship 2009 Team Stats

FIBA Oceania Championship squads
2009–10 in Oceanian basketball
2009 in New Zealand basketball
2009–10 in Australian basketball